"Baddest" is a song by American rapper Yung Bleu, featuring vocals from American R&B singer Chris Brown and rapper 2 Chainz. It was released through Vandross Music Group and Empire as the third anticipation single from Bleu's album Moon Boy on June 11, 2021. The song was written by Ivory Scott IV and produced by Hitmaka, OG Parker, Romano and Mike Woods.

Background and composition
Bleu and Hitmaka sketched the song during the first months of 2021, and Bleu asked the producer, that at the time was working on Chris Brown's album Breezy, if he could've get him to sing the hook and chorus that they wrote. After 2 Chainz added his verse, in April Hitmaka previewed the song on his Instagram posting snippets of it.

The song is an R&B, hip hop and trap mid-tempo written by Bleu, 2 Chainz and Hitmaka, and produced by OG Parker, Hitmaka, Romano and Mike Woods. The instrumental of the song contains a vocal sample of SWV's song "You're Always on My Mind", a song that was already used by Brown in an interpolation for the 2017 single "Always" by A1, where he was featured alongside Ty Dolla $ign.

Critical reception
The song received positive responses from music critics. Pitchfork reviewer Alphonse Pierre defined the song as one of Moon Boy highlights, stating that "Brown's hook carried the song to a whole other level". HotNewHipHop called the song a "smooth banger" praising Brown and 2 Chainz appearances. Fred Thomas of AllMusic complimented the song "thoughtfully constructed hook" and "gentle gliding" saying that the song has a "sunny R&B flavor".

Music video
The official music video for the song was released on July 7, 2021. In the video Bleu navigates a hood party looking for a lady, while Brown dances in a balcony looking at a full moon.

Charts

Weekly charts

Year-end charts

Certifications

Release history

References

2021 songs
2021 singles
Yung Bleu songs
Chris Brown songs
2 Chainz songs
Songs written by 2 Chainz
Songs written by Hitmaka
Empire Distribution singles